Ambu may refer to:

 Ambu (company), a Danish manufacturer of medical products
 Ambu bag, a proprietary name for a bag valve mask, a device to assist a patient's breathing
 Ambu (surname)
 Ambu, Azerbaijan, a village
 Ambu Island, off the coast of Mumbai

See also
 
 Anbu (disambiguation)